Charles M. "Bubber" Murphy (December 15, 1913 – January 31, 1999) was an American football, basketball, and baseball coach and college athletics administrator. He served as the head football coach at Middle Tennessee State University from 1947 to 1968, compiling a record of 155–63–8. Murphy was also the head basketball coach at Middle Tennessee State for one season in 1948–49 and the head baseball coach at the school in 1951 and from 1953 to 1955. The Murphy Center, an athletic facility at Middle Tennessee State, was named in his honor when it was completed in 1972. In 1976, he was inducted to the Sports Hall of Fame at Middle Tennessee State and the Tennessee Sports Hall of Fame.

Head coaching record

Football

References

Further reading
 

 Charles M. Murphy's obituary

1913 births
1999 deaths
Fort Smith Giants players
Jersey City Giants players
Meridian Eagles players
Middle Tennessee Blue Raiders athletic directors
Middle Tennessee Blue Raiders baseball coaches
Middle Tennessee Blue Raiders baseball players
Middle Tennessee Blue Raiders football coaches
Middle Tennessee Blue Raiders football players
Middle Tennessee Blue Raiders men's basketball coaches
Coaches of American football from Tennessee
Players of American football from Nashville, Tennessee
Baseball coaches from Tennessee
Baseball players from Nashville, Tennessee
Basketball coaches from Tennessee